Jos Romersa (1 November 1915 – 6 November 2016) was a Luxembourgian gymnast who competed in the 1936 Summer Olympics in Berlin, Germany. He was born in Dudelange. At the gymnastics competition, his best individual finish was 58th in the horse vault. In 2008 he was promoted to the rank of Chevalier in the Order of Merit of the Grand Duchy of Luxembourg and in 2015 he turned 100. He died in Dudelange on 6 November 2016 at the age of 101.

See also
 List of centenarians (sportspeople)

References

External links
 

1915 births
2016 deaths
Gymnasts at the 1936 Summer Olympics
Olympic gymnasts of Luxembourg
Knights of the Order of Merit of the Grand Duchy of Luxembourg
Luxembourgian centenarians
Luxembourgian male artistic gymnasts
People from Dudelange
Men centenarians